Scipione Gesualdo (died 1608) was a Roman Catholic prelate who served as Archbishop of Conza (1584–1608).

Biography
On 28 Nov 1584, Scipione Gesualdo  was appointed during the papacy of Pope Gregory XIII as Archbishop of Conza.
On 13 Jan 1585, he was consecrated bishop by Giulio Antonio Santorio, Cardinal-Priest of San Bartolomeo all'Isola, Massimiliano Palumbara, Archbishop of Benevento, and Flaminio Filonardi, Bishop of Aquino, serving as co-consecrators. 
He served as Archbishop of Conza until his death in 1608.

References 

16th-century Italian Roman Catholic bishops
17th-century Italian Roman Catholic bishops
Bishops appointed by Pope Gregory XIII
1608 deaths
Archbishops of Sant'Angelo dei Lombardi-Conza-Nusco-Bisaccia